Findlay Ridge is a broad ridge which rises to  between Miers Valley and Hidden Valley in the Denton Hills of the Scott Coast, Victoria Land, Antarctica. It was named by the New Zealand Geographic Board (1994) after New Zealand geologist Robert H. Findlay, a member of the New Zealand Geological Survey field party to this area, 1977–78.

A small elevated valley called The Altiplano sits roughly between Findlay Ridge and Miers Valley.

References 

Ridges of Victoria Land
Scott Coast